A general election was held in the U.S. state of Wyoming on November 4, 2014. All of Wyoming's executive officers were up for election as well as a United States Senate seat and Wyoming's at-large seat in the United States House of Representatives. Primary elections were held on August 19, 2014.

Governor

Incumbent Republican Governor Matt Mead ran for re-election to a second term in office. He was challenged in the primary by physician and rancher Taylor Haynes and Superintendent of Public Instruction Cindy Hill, defeating them by 54% to 32% to 13%.

In the general election, he defeated former Chairman of the Wyoming Democratic Party Pete Gosar, Independent Don Wills and Libertarian Dee Cozzens by 58% to 27% to 6% to 2%.

Secretary of State

Republican primary

Candidates
 Ed Murray, businessman
 Ed Buchanan, former Speaker of the Wyoming House of Representatives
 Pete Illoway, former State Representative
 Clark Stith, Rock Springs City Councilman

Democratic primary
No Democrat announced their candidacy for Secretary of State.

General election

State Treasurer

Republican primary

Candidates
 Mark Gordon, incumbent State Treasurer
 Ron Redo

Democratic primary
No Democrat announced their candidacy for State Treasurer.

General election

State Auditor

Republican primary

Candidates
 Cynthia Cloud, incumbent State Auditor

Democratic primary
No Democrat announced their candidacy for State Auditor.

General election

Superintendent of Public Instruction

Republican primary

Candidates
 Jillian Balow, Wyoming Department of Family Services administrator
 Sheryl Lain, retired teacher
 Bill Winney, candidate for the Wyoming House of Representatives in 2010 and 2012

Democratic primary

Candidates
 Mike Ceballos, businessman

General election

United States Senate

Incumbent Republican Senator Mike Enzi ran for re-election to a fourth term in office.

He defeated Democrat Charlie Hardy, Independent Curt Gottshall and Libertarian Joseph Porambo in the general election.

United States House of Representatives

Wyoming has a single at-large congressional district. Incumbent Republican U.S. Representative Cynthia Lummis, who has represented the state in Congress since 2011, ran for re-election to a third term in office.

She defeated Democrat Richard Grayson in the general election.

References